Bağlar is one of Diyarbakır's central districts in Turkey. In the local elections of March 2019, Zeyyat Ceylan was elected as a Mayor with 70,34% of the votes. But on 11 April the Supreme Election Board decided not to deliver him the right to serve as Mayor due to having been dismissed from public office before. The Mayorship was instead delivered to Hüseyin Beyoğlu from the Justice and Development Party (AKP) who polled second with 25,46%.

Population

Neighbourhoods

 Buyuransu 
 Ekince
 Kamışpınar 
 Karacadağ
 Karahanköy
 Kırkkoyun
 Ortaören
 Oğlaklı
 Övündüler
 Sakallı
 Yalankoz
 Yiğityolu
 Yukarıakdibek

References 

Districts of Diyarbakır Province
Kurdish settlements in Turkey